Morina is a genus of the angiosperm family Morinaceae.

Morina may also refer to:

 Morina (surname)
 Morina, a Basic Transportation Vehicle developed by GM and built in Indonesia in the late 1970s
 Mořina, a municipality and village in the Beroun District of the Czech Republic
 Morina (moth), a genus of moth
 Rhinophis or Morina, a genus of nonvenomous shield tail snakes found in southern India and Sri Lanka
 Morina (region), a region of the Gjakova highlands in Kosovo
 Morina (tribe), an Albanian tribe
 Morinë, a village of Albania at the border with Kosovo

See also 
 Igoris Morinas (born 1976), Lithuanian international footballer
 Morin
 Morini